Spilanthol is a fatty acid amide isolated from Acmella oleracea.  It is believed to be responsible for the local anesthetic properties of the plant.

Spilanthol permeates the human skin and the inside lining of the cheeks in the mouth (buccal mucosa), resulting in local as well as systemic pharmacological concentrations. In the skin and in the pancreas, spilanthol has also been shown to exert anti-inflammatory effects. The underlying mechanism involves inhibition of nitric oxide production due to reduced expression of inducible nitric oxide synthase enzyme (iNOS) in macrophages. Transcription factor array experiments revealed that spilanthol inhibits the activation of several transcription factors (NFκB, ATF4, FOXO1, IRF1, ETS1, and AP-1) which may explain the effect of spilanthol on gene expression.

See also
 Hydroxy alpha sanshool

References

Fatty acid amides
Local anesthetics